The M6800 Microcomputer System (latter dubbed the Motorola 6800 family, M6800 family, or 68xx) was a series of 8-bit microprocessors and microcontrollers from Motorola that began with the 6800 CPU. The architecture also inspired the MOS Technology 6502, and that company started in the microprocessor business producing 6800 replacements.

The chips primarily competed against Intel's 8-bit family of chips (such as the 8080, or their relations, the Zilog Z80 range).

 Motorola 6800
 Motorola 6801 (includes RAM and ROM)
 Motorola 6802 (includes RAM and an internal clock oscillator)
 Motorola 6803 (includes RAM)
 Motorola 6805
 Motorola 6808 (6802 that had failed production test of its internal RAM; Its RAM enable pin was designated GND)
 Motorola 6809
 Hitachi 6301 used in the Psion Organiser I
 Hitachi HD6303 used in the Psion Organiser II
 Hitachi 6309
 Motorola 68HC05
 Freescale 68HC08
 Freescale 68HC11
 Freescale 68HC12 (16-bit)
 Motorola 68HC16 (16-bit)

See also
 Instruction set

References

Motorola microprocessors